The men's field hockey event at the 2018 Commonwealth Games was held at the Gold Coast Hockey Centre from 5 to 14 April 2018. Australia won the gold medal after defeating New Zealand 2–0 in the final, continuing their dominance in the event with a sixth consecutive gold medal, having won the men's tournament every time it has been held.

Umpires
Twelve umpires for the men's event were appointed by the International Hockey Federation.

 Rawi Anbananthan (MAS)
 Tim Bond (NZL)
 Ben de Young (AUS)
 Jamie Hooper (WAL)
 Deepak Joshi (IND)
 Tyler Klenk (CAN)
 Eric Koh (MAS)
 Lim Hong Zhen (SGP)
 Sean Rapaport (RSA)
 David Sweetman (SCO)
 Paul Walker (ENG)
 Deon Nel (RSA)

Results
All times are local (UTC+10)

Preliminary round

Pool A

Pool B

Classification matches

Ninth and tenth place

Seventh and eighth place

Fifth and sixth place

Medal round

Semi-finals

Bronze-medal match

Gold-medal match

Statistics

Final standings

Goalscorers

References

Hockey at the 2018 Commonwealth Games